Frederick Anthony Huggins (March 6, 1899 – July 15, 1976) was an American football player and coach. He served as the head football coach at Providence College in Providence, Rhode Island from 1921 to 1924, compiling a record of 15–15–2. Huggins was named to the 1918 College Football All-America Team as a guard while playing for Brown University.

Huggins entered the United States Army Air Forces in 1942. After serving in the Pacific War during World War II, he was discharged four years later with the rank of major. Huggins worked for the Veterans Administration from 1946 until his retirement in 1965.
He died on July 15, 1976, at his home in Newport, Rhode Island.

Head coaching record

College football

References

External links
 

1899 births
1976 deaths
American football guards
Brown Bears football players
Navy Midshipmen football coaches
Providence Friars football coaches
United States Army Air Forces officers
United States Army Air Forces personnel of World War II